Hanamanhal is a village in Dharwad district of Karnataka, India.

Demographics 
As of the 2011 Census of India there were 232 households in Hanamanakoppa and a total population of 1,491 consisting of 758 males and 733 females. There were 212 children ages 0-6.

References

Villages in Dharwad district